Welding goggles provide a degree of eye protection while some forms of welding and cutting are being done. They are intended to protect the eyes not only from the heat and optical radiation produced by the welding, such as the intense ultraviolet light produced by an electric arc, but also from sparks or debris. A full facemask may be required for arc welding.

Welding and cutting processes, including arc welding and cutting, as well as brazing produce intense ultraviolet (UV), infrared (IR) and visible light wavelengths. The UV and IR wavelengths cannot be seen and can produce eye injury without the victim realizing it immediately. Extremely dark filters of the proper sort are needed for the welder to be able to look at the intensely glowing metal being welded. An approved face shield or welding helmet can also have filters for optical radiation protection, and offer additional protection against debris and sparks. UV blocking protective spectacles with side shields or welding goggles are considered primary protection, with the face shield or welding helmet considered secondary protection. This way, the eyes are still protected even when the face shield or helmet is lifted up.

The optical filter in welding goggles, face mask or helmet  must be a type which is suitable for the sort of work being done. A filter suitable for gas welding, for instance, should not be used for arc welding. Face masks which are self dimming are available for arc welding, MIG, TIG, and plasma cutting, and allow better vision before the arc is struck and after it is extinguished. Failure to use such protection when arc welding or even being near where arc welding is going on can result in a painful condition called "arc eye", or photokeratitis, which is akin to a severe sunburn of the cornea and conjunctiva of the eye.

See also 
 Oxy-fuel welding and cutting
 Welding mask

References

External links 

 Recommended filter densities for welding, brazing and cutting, per American Welding Society
 OSHA standard 1910 Subpart I App B: Personal protective equipment
 OSHA standard 1910.252(b)(2)(ii)(H):"	Welding, Cutting, and Brazing-General requirement

Welding safety
Goggles